An emancipist was a convict sentenced and transported under the convict system to Australia, who had been given a conditional or absolute pardon. The term was also used to refer to those convicts whose sentences had expired, and might sometimes be used of free settlers who supported full civil rights for emancipated convicts.

An emancipist was free to own land and was no longer subject to penal servitude. An emancipist could be released from his or her sentence for good behaviour, diligent work or the expiration of his or her sentence. One limitation placed upon emancipists with a conditional pardon – a ticket-of-leave – was that they were not allowed to leave the Australian colonies. This limitation did not apply to former convicts whose terms of servitude had expired, or who had been unconditionally pardoned, and more than half of all male convicts did leave the Australian colonies on the expiration of their sentence [it was more difficult for female emancipists to leave, as they had fewer opportunities of "working their passage" away from the colonies].

The Exclusives (who included many free settlers, civil servants and military officers) often shunned the society of emancipists, and considered them to be little more than criminals. When Governor Lachlan Macquarie invited emancipists to social functions at Government House, for example, many military officers refused to attend.

Macquarie (Governor from 1810 to 1821) insisted that emancipated convicts be treated as social equals and, very conscious of the critical shortage of skills in the young colony, appointed emancipists with talent to official positions. Among these appointments were Francis Greenway as colonial architect and Dr. William Redfern as colonial surgeon. He scandalised settler opinion by appointing another emancipist, Andrew Thompson, as a magistrate.

John Irving (or Irven, Irwin, or Ervin) was Australia's first emancipist. Irving was a surgeon convicted of larceny on 6 March 1784. He was sentenced to "seven years beyond the seas," and sent on one of the First Fleet transports in 1788. After exhibiting a willing readiness to assist with his exceptional surgical skills, he was emancipated by Governor Arthur Phillip on 28 February 1790, and worked thereafter as an assistant surgeon. On 14 July 1792, Irving's Warrant of Emancipation was received in England and acknowledged by Henry Dundas, the Secretary of State.

References

External links
 A Short History of Australia

Convictism in Australia
Pardons
Emancipation